The Battle of Pencon or Pencoed was a battle won by the Britons (modern Welsh), possibly against the Mercians or against themselves, around the year 720.

Accounts
The Chronicle of the Princes places the battle in AD 720. The Annals of Wales are undated but Phillimore placed the following entry in the year 722:

Although the Annals of Wales does not specifically identify the Anglo-Saxons as the enemy, it is considered that the failure to specify an enemy was simply because it would have been obvious. While other theories suggest the battle could have been between the Welsh and Cornish themselves.

The Chronicle of Princes seems to refute this logic, specifically excluding Pencoed from Rhodri Molwynog's conflict with the Saxons that year:

Location
Castell Pen-y-Coed, an earthwork in Carmarthenshire, Wales has been suggested as the possible site of the battle of Pencon.
Another site is next to Coed y Mwstwr (lit. Field of the Muster) and Ogof y Pebyll (caves next the Encampments) at Pencoed, near Bridgend in Glamorgan

References

720s conflicts
8th century in England
Pencon
Pencon
Pencon
Military history of England
Military history of Wales
Military history of Herefordshire
8th century in Wales